Persepolis Football Club is an Iranian professional football club based in Tehran, that competes in the Persian Gulf Pro League.

Persepolis was founded in 1963 by Ali Abdo and has been in the first division of Iranian football since 1968. Persepolis also had three teams in bowling, basketball and volleyball in its first years of establishment. Persepolis F.C. is the football club of the multisport Persepolis Athletic and Cultural Club. The club is owned by the Ministry of Youth Affairs and Sports. There have been many attempts to privatize the club with no success due to the large debt the club has accumulated.

The club has played at its home ground, Azadi Stadium, since 1973. They contest the Tehran derby, which is regarded as one of the biggest in Asia, with archrivals Esteghlal, a match that is always closely followed by Iranian football fans. According to the Asian Football Confederation, Persepolis is the most popular football club in Asia.
At the AFC Champions League, Persepolis has the records of the most attendances (11 matches among 20 matches with the most attendances) and five matches with the most attendances. Persepolis has also broken the record of 100,000 attendances in four matches at AFC Champions League. Persepolis has won a record fourteen Iranian league titles, as well as six Hazfi Cups, four Super Cups and the 1990–91 Asian Cup Winners' Cup. Many notable players have played for the club, including former Bayern Munich players Ali Karimi, Ali Daei, Vahid Hashemian and former Hamburger SV player Mehdi Mahdavikia. However, Ali Parvin is widely regarded as the club's greatest ever player. Parvin spent 18 years with the club from 1970 to 1988.

History

Shahin F.C. (1942–1967)

Shahin was established in 1942 by Dr. Abbas Ekrami, a teacher.
Ekrami founded the club with help of some young students under the motto:

Shahin produced many talented players like Parviz Dehdari, Masoud Boroumand, Homayoun Behzadi, Jafar Kashani, Hossein Kalani, Hamid Shirzadegan, and many more that played for Iran national football team. These talents made Shahin popular in the 1960s but its very popularity was viewed as a threat by the Iran Football Federation and the Keihan Varzeshi newspaper (Iran's most important sports publication at the time).
The conflict between them became worse and on 9 July 1967, two days after Shahin's 3–0 win against Tehranjavan F.C., the Iran Sports Organization declared Shahin F.C. as dissolved. League attendance dropped and other clubs including Pas, Rah Ahan, and Oghab tried to sign Shahin players.

Establishment early years (1963–1969)

Persepolis Athletic and Cultural Club was established in 1963 by Ali Abdo. Abdo had returned to Iran from the United States and was a championship boxer.

Persepolis F.C. started the 1968 season with Parviz Dehdari as manager. Despite the efforts to sign and disperse Shahin players to various clubs, Parviz Dehdari and Masoud Boroumand transferred the popularity of Shahin to Persepolis F.C. by taking most Shahin Players to join Persepolis. The team was initially quite weak, and participated in the 2nd division of the country. The best player on the team then was Mahmoud Khordbin.

The club, using four Shahin players, had a friendly match with Jam Abadan, a respected team at the time. After the match the remainder of the Shahin players joined Persepolis. That year no league competition was held, as many teams had been dissolved, so a 44-team tournament was held, and Persepolis, along with Pas, Taj, and Oghab finished top of the group.

The next year they represented as the first Iranian club in the Asian Champion Club Tournament held in Thailand, but they were not successful and were eliminated in the group stage.

Takht Jamshid Cup (1969–1979)

In 1962, the Iran Universal (Iran National "Iran Nacional") automobile factory was opened. In 1969, The boss of the factory, Mahmoud Khayami, who was also the owner of a football team, was a big fan of Shahin. Khayami, who wanted to improve his football team, entered into negotiations with Persepolis and was able to get all the former Shahin players except Aziz Asli and Mahmoud Khordbin to join his new team, Paykan Tehran F.C.
Paykan won the championship that year, but the new players moved back to Persepolis at the end of the season.

In 1971, Persepolis won its first ever championship in the Iranian League.
Persepolis had an impressive season with 13 wins and 1 draw, in 14 weeks. In 1972, Abdo announced Persepolis as the first professional football club in Iran. The club did not enter the domestic league and only played against foreign clubs, and a few months later it became amateur again Next year the Takht Jamshid Cup was established.
Persepolis won the inaugural Takht Jamshid Cup in 1973 and won it again in 1975.
In the third year of establishment of Takhte Jamshid cup Persepolis lost just two matches of thirty matches of that year.
Persepolis is the most successful club in the Takht Jamshid Cup league, clinching two championship titles and finishing three times as runner-up.

Success under tough conditions (1979–1990)

When the Iranian Revolution took place in 1979, Abdo returned to United States. Although Persepolis won the Espandi Cup, the club fell apart and many of the old players did not return.
The club's property was sequestered by The Oppressed and Veterans Foundation and the club placed under the responsibility of The Physical Education Organization of Iran.

In 1981, the Physical Education Department declared that the name of the club would change, but club officials, players, and fans opposed the move. The team didn't appear in the match against Homa in the Tehran league as a protest against the Physical Education Department. They lost the match 3–0 by default and Homa became champion. In 1986, The club was taken over by the Oppressed and Veterans Foundation and renamed Azadi (meaning "freedom"). Players declared that they wouldn't play for the club if the name change went through. After a brief period the Foundation did not want the club any more, and it was taken over by the Physical Education Department again.
On 16 February 1987, the Physical Education Department renamed the club Pirouzi (meaning "victory") with players' agreement, although fans still call the team by its original name, Persepolis. On 10 April 2012 the club chairman Mohammad Rouyanian announced that the club will officially only be known as Persepolis.

In the 1980s the club only played in the Tehran League and various elimination tournaments. Persepolis was successful during this time and maintained its popularity, winning the Tehran League five seasons in a row. During all that time, Ali Parvin served as player-manager.

Revitalization (1990–2001)
The 1990s were a dream decade for the team, with four league championships, two Hazfi Cups, dozens of great players, and renewed support. At one point more than six Persepolis players were starters on Iran's national team.
The team won the national championship in the 1995–96 season. At one point in that season they were 10 points behind Bahman. They came back and finished first, six points ahead of the league runner-up. They won the league again the next season, again finishing ahead of the runner up by six points. They were stopped by the Korean side Pohang Steelers in the semi-finals of the Asian Champions' Cup. Persepolis finished third, defeating Iraq's Al-Zawraa in the third place match.

The next season they showed good form again, but due to their commitments in the Asian Champions' Cup and the large number of national team players they had, they withdrew from the league. The poor scheduling and mismanagement of both the I.R.I.F.F. and AFC officials led to this unprofessional event. This prevented Persepolis from possibly winning a third consecutive league championship. Persepolis did not have much luck in the Asian Champion's cup either, as they were once again stopped in the semi-finals, this time by Chinese club, Dalian Wanda. They lost the third place match as well to Al-Hilal.

The 1996–97 and 1997–98 Persepolis teams are considered by many to be among the greatest Iranian clubs to ever play. National team players and future superstars such as Ahmadreza Abedzadeh, Khodadad Azizi, Karim Bagheri, Ali Daei, Mehdi Mahdavikia, Mehrdad Minavand, Ali Karimi and many more were among the players who played for the club in those years.

After the World Cup 1998, several of Persepolis' best players were transferred to European clubs, but Persepolis was able to keep a talented squad. Future national team members Ali Karimi and Hamed Kavianpour would join the team at this time. They won the 1998–99 championship as well as the Hazfi Cup that season. They also won the 1999–2000 league championship, finishing third again in the Asian Champions Cup. This would be their last championship in the Azadegan League era.

Most of Persepolis' championships at the time were won while Ali Parvin was the manager, and Amirali Abedini was the chairman.

IPL era (2001–present)

Persepolis entered the newly established IPL looking to dominate once again, but near the end of the season they were in a very close race with their rival Esteghlal.
Esteghlal led the league by two points going into the final day of the regular season. Esteghlal's loss to Malavan and Persepolis' 1–0 win against Fajr Sepasi in their last games of the season gave Persepolis a one-point lead and another championship. Their 2001–02 season championship made them the first-ever IPL champions.
The 2002–03 season proved to be extremely difficult and Persepolis finished third, never managing to come close to the eventual winners, Sepahan. They also fell apart in the newly created AFC Champions League, failing to advance out of the group stage.

When Akbar Ghamkhar took over as club chairman, he made several changes in an effort to improve the team. He made public the amount of player and staff salaries, severely angering Parvin, the highest paid player on the team. Ghamkhar hired coach Vinko Begović, and entered into contracts with several prominent players. Persepolis started off very well in the 2003–04 season but things deteriorated. Begovic left the team and German manager Rainer Zobel was bought in. Parvin was brought back, taking the position of technical director. The club finished fifth in the standings in the 2004–05 season.

Ghamkhar was replaced with Hojatollah Khatib. He decided to bring back Parvin. The club experienced major financial problems as some of the spending decisions made in previous years had overextended the club. Persepolis finished the 2005–06 season in ninth place, the lowest it had ever placed. Parvin left the club in February 2006, vowing to never return to Persepolis, after a 4–2 loss to Fajr Sepasi in Azadi Stadium. After the game, the fans began cursing at Ali Parvin and the players.

Khatib resigned as chairman and Mohammad Hassan Ansarifard was elected to the post by the club council. Arie Haan was brought in as the new manager, helping the team make it to the 2005–06 Hazfi Cup final, but he was fired by the club just before the 2006–07 season began. Turkish manager Mustafa Denizli signed with the team on 17 August 2006. With the final cup match being his first one as the club's manager, Denizli was not able to help the club win the Hazfi Cup in 2006, a cup that the team needed to gain entry into the Asian Champion's League and to receive financial benefits by doing so.

The club did not win the Hazfi Cup the next year either, losing to Sepahan in the semifinals in June 2007. The club finished third in the IPL 2006–07, and Denizli left the club after Ansarifard resigned as chairman in June 2007.

Afshin Ghotbi: Emperor epoch

Habib Kashani became the club chairman in June 2007 and selected Afshin Ghotbi as head coach of Persepolis for the 2007–08 season.
Ghotbi Promised to lead Persepolis to the IPL championship and started the IPL with a 3–2 win over Sanat Naft. Persepolis was undefeated until the 17th round, where they suffered a 2–1 loss to Sepahan. On 9 January 2008, the disciplinary committee of the Iranian Football Federation announced because of a serious injury to a security soldier by the Sepahan fans, Sepahan would be charged with a five-point deduction. This was later reduced to three points. Persepolis was also docked six points by FIFA because of unpaid wages to a number of former players. This placed Persepolis behind Sepahan in the standings.
Near the end of the season Sheys Rezaei and Mohammad Reza Mamani were expelled by the team after both players showed poor behavior towards club players, coaches, and management as well as other non-football-related issues. Habib Kashani and Mahmoud Khordbin both suffered heart attacks. Persepolis cut Sepahan's seven-point lead to two points by the last game of the season.

In the last week, Persepolis defeated Sepahan when Sepehr Heidari scored a 90+6th-minute goal in front of over 110,000 fans in Azadi Stadium to give Persepolis its second championship in the IPL and a berth in the Asian Champions League. In the 2007–2008 Golden Ball award ceremony Persepolis, Afshin Ghotbi, and Mohsen Khalili won the Team, Manager, and Player of the year titles.

Ghotbi's contract expired at the end of the season and he decided to leave the club. His assistant, Hamid Estili, was very close to management but, Kashani and other club officials resigned because of conflicts between them and the Iran Physical Education Department. Dariush Mostafavi was selected as club chairman. Mostafavi promised to bring Ghotbi back. Negotiations were successful, and on 4 July 2008, Ghotbi signed a two-year contract with Persepolis. Ghotbi had many problems with Mostafavi and resigned on 19 November 2008. When talking to the popular Iranian show 90, Ghotbi showed tears before leaving Persepolis and the fans that loved him who had given him the nickname Emperor.

However, Ghotbi left the team in mid-season after a series of losses and eventually became head coach of the Iran national football team.

Due to the mismanagement of the club, Persepolis had underachieved in the recent seasons of the Iran Pro League. The selection of incompetent coaches, and the acquisition of low quality players have enhanced the present deep in form. After the resignation of Ghotbi, his assistant Afshin Peyrovani was named as interim head coach of the club, led the team in 11 matches in Iran Pro League but he was replaced with former Portugal and Saudi Arabia manager, Nelo Vingada. Vingada's contract was terminated at the end of the season.

Daei years

After Vingada was sacked as head coach of the club, former Croatia and Dinamo Zagreb manager, Zlatko Kranjčar was hired as his successor but he was soon replaced with former Persepolis and Iran national football team captain, Ali Daei. At the end of the 2009–10 Season, Persepolis finished fourth in the league but they became Hazfi Cup champions. In the Hazfi Cup final, Persepolis defeated Azadegan League side Gostaresh Foolad Tabriz 4–1 on aggregate to qualify for the 2011 AFC Champions League. In the 2010–11 season, Persepolis finished fourth in the league and was eliminated in the group stage of the 2011 AFC Champions League but at the end of the season Persepolis won the 2010–11 Hazfi Cup after defeating rivals Sepahan, Foolad and Malavan. The technical committee chose Hamid Estili as Daei's successor on that day. Under the management of Daei, Persepolis won back to back trophies for the first time in 13 seasons.

After Daei's resignation, Hamid Estili, Mustafa Denizli, Manuel José and most recently Yahya Golmohammadi managed Persepolis for a record 4 head coaches in only two seasons. Golmohammadi led Persepolis to the final of the Hazfi Cup, but losing to Sepahan on penalties. After the Hazfi Cup, Golmohammadi announced that he would not be managing Persepolis the following season.

However, Daei returned to the club and signed a three years contract before the start of 2013–14 season. Under Daei Persepolis finished second with 55 points, 2 points behind Champions Foolad. Persepolis retained its place in the AFC Champions League after a two-year absence.

After a poor start to the 2014–15 season which left Persepolis in 9th place, Daei was sacked and was replaced by Hamid Derakhshan.

Ivanković years

On 5 April 2015, Hamid Derakhshan resigned as head coach of Persepolis and was temporarily replaced by Hossein Abdi.
 On the following day, former Iran national football team manager Branko Ivanković was named as new head coach of the club.

On 15 May 2015 Ivanković won his first Tehran derby after a 1–0 victory over Esteghlal. Later that week on 19 May 2015 Persepolis defeated Al-Hilal 1–0 in the first leg of AFC Champions League round of 16. In the second leg they lost 3–0 against Al-Hilal and were eliminated.

After the departure of Mohammad Nouri, the club named Hadi Norouzi as the captain for the 2015–16 season. Persepolis was also very active in the summer transfer season, adding Iranian international Ramin Rezaeian, Croatian defender Luka Marić and Honduras international Jerry Bengtson.

On 1 October 2015, the club captain Hadi Norouzi died in his sleep at the age of 30 after an apparent heart attack. His death caused a profound shock in Iranian sports.

After the death of Hadi Norouzi Persepolis improved their form and their long unbeaten streak propelled them to the top 3 midway through the season. After a historic 4–2 win against Esteghlal in the Tehran derby, the team moved into first place. However, after a loss to Naft Tehran on 28 April, the team dropped down to third place. Persepolis won the following week match against Gostaresh Foolad and moved into second place, behind Esteghlal Khuzestan on goal difference. A final day win on 13 May 2016 against Rah Ahan was not enough for Persepolis as Esteghlal Khuzestan also won and were crowned champions of Persian Gulf Pro League 2015–16.

Before the 2016–17 season, Persepolis added national team members Alireza Beiranvand, Jalal Hosseini, and Vahid Amiri. Persepolis started the season strong and never dropped below third place. They set records for least ever goals conceded and most ever points accumulated after 17 weeks in a Persian Gulf Pro League season. On April 15, 2017, Persepolis became the champions of the season with three weeks remaining to the end of the season. After a victory against Machine Sazi, Persepolis claimed its third championship in the Persian Gulf Pro League and its 10th championship in total. Persepolis defended its championship in the Persian Gulf Pro League 2017–18 and won Super cup.

On 30 May 2017 Persepolis made history again after advancing to the Quarterfinals after defeating Qatari club Lekhwiya 1–0 in the AFC Champions League Round of 16. This was the first time in club history that Persepolis made Quarterfinals in the current Champions League format. Persepolis beat Saudi club Al Ahli 5–3 on aggregate to make it to the Semifinals, where they lost to Al Hilal 6–2 on aggregate. the following year Persepolis advanced to AFC Champions League Final in 2018 and lost 2–0 in First-leg. Persepolis were held to a goalless draw by Kashima Antlers of Japan in the second leg of the AFC Champions League. On 16 May 2019, Branko Ivanković made another history with Persepolis by hat-trick of championship of Iran premier football league in Persian Gulf Pro League. However, he left the club at the end of season after 4 years, winning a record 7 trophies for a foreign coach.

Colours and crest

Persepolis Football Club was named after the historical landmark, Persepolis, the capital of the Achaemenid Empire. The club logo incorporates elements from the location.
The first design of Persepolis' crest used the Faravahar, an ancient Persian and Zoroastrian symbol. The Faravahar is a man with falcon wings, each with three feathers. This version of the crest used in early years. After that there was not a crest on the shirt until the 1980s. In the middle of the 1980s the design of the crest changed. This version had two bull heads attached to one body as seen on a column at Apadana. A cup is designed on the top of the body and Olympic rings are seen under the cup. The bull is the symbol of productivity in ancient Persian beliefs and Persian Literature and the cup on the top of the column represents the championship. In the mid 1990s the crest changed again and became more stylized; the crest became bent and the Olympic rings were dropped, the cup became more explicit while bull heads leaned to the cup. This version used until 2004; the following crest was simpler still. The Olympic rings returned to the crest and the bull of past versions was turned into Homa, another mythological creature and symbol used in the architecture of Persepolis. In 2012, during 2011–2012 season, and before 74th Tehran derby, club released a new version of its logo This current version of the club's logo incorporates the previous version into a whole red shield shaped frame entailing the name of Persepolis in Persian and English.

One of Persepolis' nicknames is Sorkhpoushan ("The Reds"), stemming from their traditional kit, which is predominantly red. From the foundation of the club, the common home kit includes a red shirt, red (in some seasons black or white) shorts, and red socks. White and black colours are also seen in the kit. In the early 1970s the shorts were black; white shorts were used in the late 1970s, and red shorts became predominant in the 1980s.

In the 2006–07 season, fans saw the team wear red and white striped shirts. The away kit of the club is commonly with a white background.

Stadium and facilities

When Persepolis F.C. was created, the sport club already had a number of buildings such as gymnasiums, swimming pools, and bowling alleys in the Bowling Abdo Complex. The facility is in the north of Tehran hosted 1976 Bowling World Cup and renamed Shahid Chamran Bowling after the revolution. There was initially no stadium for the football team. Ali Abdo bought some land in the Ekbatan area of Tehran and constructed a stadium there. At the time it was known as Apadana stadium. Persepolis played only one game at the stadium due to poor organization of the seating and a lack of co-operation with other Iranian clubs. Persepolis only used the stadium as a training ground.

Around the time of mid-1970s, Abdo had to sell much of the club's property to keep the club functioning due to its poor financial situation; he sold Apadana Stadium to Rah Ahan for 200,000 Tomans in 1975. Apadana Stadium is now called Rah Ahan Stadium. Due to the Iranian Islamic Revolution in 1979 club properties were confiscated by the Oppressed and Veterans Foundation (Bonyad Mostazafan); Bowling Abdo, the club's original headquarters, burnt down, Abdo returned to the United States.

Azadi stadium

Before the construction of Azadi Stadium in 1971, Persepolis played its matches at Amjadieh (Shahid Shiroudi) Stadium. They have played almost all of their home games at Azadi Stadium, except for the 2002–03 season, when they played all but two of their home matches at Tehran's Takhti Stadium while renovations were taking place at Azadi.

In mid-2006 Persepolis considered buying Shahre Ghods Stadium, but the deal fell through due to Persepolis' poor financial situation and the long distance between the city center and the stadium.

Derafshifar stadium

This stadium is the training ground and Academy base of Iranian football club Persepolis.
Inside the complex, there are training areas, a hotel and pools. There is also a sauna, steam and weight rooms, a restaurant, conference rooms and offices.

Derafshifar Stadium was given to Persepolis in 2013 and it was considered as the club's property. President Mohammad Rouyanian announced that after his efforts Iranian government accepted the assignment of Derafshifar Stadium to Persepolis and he said that it is an enterprise in order to increase the club's properties.

Shahid Kazemi Stadium

Persepolis became the owner of Shahid Kazemi Stadium in the winter of 2016. The stadium with a capacity of 15,000 is to be used for training sessions and friendly matches. The complex has a sauna, steam room, weight room, restaurant and conference room.

In January 2017, the club announced they would renovate the complex by adding a second natural grass pitch, adding parking lots, and a cafeteria. As well as upgrading the already existing conference room, changeroom, gym and swimming area.

Persepolis university

It is first Iranian sport university which opened in 2013. Dariuosh Soudi was appointed as the first president of the university and Mehdi Mahdavikia was the first student of this university. This university has 600 students and accepts students in thirteen different fields.

Some fields provided by the university:

Football Coaching
Futsal Coaching
Fitness
Sport Reporting
Match Commentary

Persepolis TV

In June 2013 Persepolis launched their first full-time television channel, with the channel to be available on Hot Bird satellites across the world. The manager of Persepolis TV was Reza Rashidpour. However the channel closed in October 2013.

During the 2017–18 season, Persepolis reopened its channel with the name of Persepolis TV.

Persepolis internet radio

The radio of the club started working after revealing new version of Persepolis official website. This radio worked through recording programs and make them ready for fans to download from the club's official website. The number of recordings and programs was more than thirty different entertaining parts and the number of downloads of each program was more than one million. President Rouyanian came on an agreement with "Iran Seda" internet radio to put its link in the official website of the club and make it possible to listen to the live commentary of the 77th Tehran derby through it. The commentator of this match was Eskandar Koti one of the most famous commentators in Iran.

Persepolis energy drinks

The club started producing energy drinks since 2013. This product is advertised widely in IRIB TV channels.

Persepolis restaurants

The club established these restaurants as an economic movement in order to improve its fans feeling of living with the club through their routine life. Persepolis restaurants chain based in different cities of Iran. The first Persepolis restaurant opened in Shiraz where the Iranian precious historical places "Takhte Jamshid" and "Persepolis" are located. As of May 2014, there are four branches of Persepolis restaurants open in Iran.

Rivalries

Tehran Derby 

Persepolis is one side of Iran's and Asia's most important club football match which is called Tehran Derby. The rivalry between Persepolis and Esteghlal was derived from the previous significant derby between Shahin and Taj.

This match was declared as the most important derby in Asia and 22nd most important derby in the world in June 2008 by World Soccer magazine.

After the departure of Shahin players to Persepolis, the club became too popular and its arch-rival Taj (meaning "crown" in Persian) was the royal team supported by the Shah of Iran, Mohammad Reza. As the two biggest and most successful clubs in Iran, nowadays the rivalry continues on an annual basis with both teams often challenging each other for the championship. In each transfer season, both clubs try to attract rival team players.

Esteghlal has the most wins in the derby, but Persepolis has the largest margin of victory. Historically defeating Esteghlal 6–0 on 7 September 1973.

Persepolis vs Sepahan 
Another Persepolis rival is Sepahan, the club based in Esfahan. Both clubs were dependent upon Shahin; one hired most of the Shahin players in its early years and the other was the branch of Shahin F.C. in Esfahan. The rivalry renewed in the early 2000s (decade), when Esfahan rose in Iran football. Sepahan and Zob Ahan became strong, replacing Tehran popular teams in the 2002–2003 season. Both of Iran's important football competitions, IPL and the Hazfi Cup, were won by Esfahan teams that season.
Persepolis also had a derby against the now dissolved club, Pas Tehran.

Persepolis vs Tractor 
 
Started in 2009 when Tractor returned to first tier of Iranian football league after 8 years and their fans had passion about this event. Mustafa Denizli is one of the club's most popular coaches in this rivalry.

Players

First-team squad

See also: 2022–23 Persepolis F.C. season

Players on Loan

Retired numbers

On 6 October 2015, the club decided to retire the squad number 24 in memory of Hadi Norouzi, who died of heart attack in sleep at the age of 30. He played for Persepolis at the time.

Notable players
For notable players see List of Persepolis F.C. players.
For details on former players see :Category:Persepolis F.C. players.

Club captains

Hall of Fame
The players below are part of the Persepolis F.C. Hall of Fame:

1960s and 1970s
  Ebrahim Ashtiani (DF)
  Homayoun Behzadi (FW)
  Hamid Jasemian (DF)
  Hossein Kalani (FW)
  Jafar Kashani (DF)
  Mahmoud Khordbin (FW)
  Fereydoun Moeini (MF)
  Ali Parvin (MF)
  Kazem Rahimi (MF)
  Hadi Tavoosi (GK)
  Büyük Vatankhah (DF)
  Reza Vatankhah (DF)

Managers

Notable managers

The table below shows Persepolis managers that have won noteworthy titles or had a great impact on the team. For a more detailed and chronological list of Persepolis managers from 1964 onwards with their trophies, see List of Persepolis F.C. managers.

Personnel

Technical staff

Management
{| class="wikitable"
|-
!Office
!Name
|-
|Chairman
|Reza Darvish
|-
|Deputy chairman
|Mohammad Mohammadi
|-
|Board secretary
|Hossein Shahriyari
|-
|Board members
|Hossein ShahriyariHossein KhabiriMohammad FayyazGholamali Mohammadalipour
|-

Honours

 

¤First ever winners
* Won League title and Hazfi Cup
♦ Won Tehran League title and Tehran Hazfi Cup
 shared record

Continental history

Individual honours
Asian Young Footballer of the Year
 1997 – Mehdi Mahdavikia

Asian Footballer of the Year
 1990 – Farshad Pious Runner-up
 1996 – Ali Daei Runner-up
 1997 – Khodadad Azizi Runner-up
 1997 – Karim Bagheri Runner-up
 2012 – Ali Karimi Runner-up
 2019 – Alireza Beiranvand Runner-up

Iran World Cup captains
 1978 – Ali Parvin
 1998 – Ahmad Reza Abedzadeh

AFC Asian Cup MVP Award
 1996 – Khodadad Azizi

Statistics and records

Ali Parvin holds the record for Persepolis appearances with 341, having played between 1970 and 1988, while Afshin Peyrovani holds the league appearances records with 209, playing from 1993 to 2004.

The record for a goalkeeper is held by Vahid Ghelich, with 176 appearances. The record for total Persepolis appearances among current players is held by Hadi Norouzi with 175 appearances and 32 goals.

With 149 caps, Ali Daei of Iran is Persepolis' most capped international player. Farshad Pious is the club's all-time top goalscorer in all competitions with 153 goals in 211 matches, playing between 1985 and 1998.

 Persepolis set Iran the highest division League records for most titles (14) and most runners-up (9).
 All-time top scorer: Farshad Pious with 153 goals (All Competitions)
 Record of scoring in 36 consecutive matches in two seasons and a record 22 games unbeaten.(2014–2015)

Ownership

Though privatization of Persepolis, alongside Esteghlal, has been on the agenda of several administrations, it has not become materialized so far, most probably due to the government's lack of interest to bequeath the enormous social (and potentially financial) capital of the two clubs to private entities. In May 2009, in the run-up to the 2009 presidential election, President Mahmoud Ahmadinejad stated that the club will be privatized, however, this did not happen. A second much anticipated bid in May 2015 was called null and void after Persepolis fan and tycoon Hossein Hedayat was found unqualified by Iranian Privatization Organization . It is expected that the transfer of the club to private investors will be a long process, largely due to problems with the club's financial documents and the debts that the club has accumulated that make it unable to be listed on the Tehran Stock Exchange. Shares for the club can be sold on the OTC market once it has removed all of its financial ambiguities.

Sponsorship

Main sponsor: Tourism Bank
Official shirt manufacturer: Uhlsport
Official sponsor: Minoo Corp.

Shirt sponsors and manufacturers

§ in 2009–10 Persepolis wear Hessari in first three matches.
¤  in 2016–17 Persepolis wear Givova in first ten matches.

Supporters

Persepolis is one of the highest supported teams in Iranian football. It is said in unofficial counts that the club has over 40 million fans.
The club is based in Tehran and is popular in all parts of country. Persepolis also has a fan base in Afghanistan and Persian Gulf countries.

Famous fans
The peoples below are little part of the Persepolis most famous fans:

Mohammad Khatami, Former President of Iran
Mohammad Reza Khatami, Politician
Sohrab Sepehri, Poet
Houshang Ebtehaj, Poet
Davoud Rashidi, Actor
Khosro Shakibaei, Actor
Morteza Ahmadi, Actor
Masoud Kimiai, Director
Tahmineh Milani, Director
Masoud Behnoud, Journalist
Mahmoud Khayami, Founder of Iran Khodro
Hossein Sabet, Businessman and former owner of Dariush Grand Hotel
Mohammad Reza Shajarian, Singer
Homayoun Shajarian, Singer
Pejman Bazeghi, Actor
Kambiz Dirbaz, Actor

Affiliated clubs

 AC Milan
 Rubin Kazan
 Beira-Mar
 Real Madrid

See also

Reserve teams
 Persepolis Academy
 Persepolis B
 Persepolis Qaemshahr
 Persepolis Shomal

References

External links

 Official club website 
 Persepolis F.C. at IFLO 
 Persepolis F.C. at FIFA 
 

 
Association football clubs established in 1963
Football clubs in Iran
Sport in Tehran
1963 establishments in Iran
Sport in Iran
Asian Cup Winners Cup winning clubs